Pakość  is a village located in the administrative district of Gmina Choszczno, within Choszczno County, West Pomeranian Voivodeship, in north-western Poland. It is located within the historic region of Pomerania.

References

Villages in Choszczno County